Choi Joo-hwan (Hangul: 최주환; born February 28, 1988) is a South Korean second baseman who plays for the SSG Landers in the KBO League. He bats left-handed and throws right-handed.

Amateur career 
While attending Dongsung High School in Gwangju, Choi was considered one of the best second basemen in the Korean high school baseball league. In May  Choi led his team to win the 39th President's Cup National High School Baseball Championship alongside Yang Hyeon-Jong and Han Ki-Joo, winning the RBI title with 9.

In September 2005, Choi was selected for the South Korea national junior baseball team to compete at the World Junior Baseball Championship, where South Korea won the silver medal. In the tourney, he batted .353 (6-for-17), playing in all 5 games as a starting second baseman.

Notable international careers

Professional career 
After graduation from high school, Choi was selected by the Doosan Bears with the 50th overall pick of the  KBO Draft. In , he played in a career-high 16 games and had 4 hits and 6 RBI.

In , Choi appeared in only nine games for the Bears, collecting no hits in ten at-bats. After the 2009 season, Choi temporarily left the Bears to serve a two-year mandatory military commitment.

Notable international careers

External links 
 Korea Baseball Organization career statistics from Koreabaseball.com

1988 births
Living people
Sportspeople from Gwangju
Doosan Bears players
KBO League infielders
KBO League second basemen
South Korean baseball players
Baseball players at the 2020 Summer Olympics
Olympic baseball players of South Korea